Finks and Gokey Block, built in 1881, is "one of the earliest brick commercial buildings" in Grand Forks, North Dakota.  It was listed on the National Register of Historic Places in 1983.

Its second floor was remodeled by architect John W. Ross.

The listing is described in its North Dakota Cultural Resources Survey document, and it was covered in a 1981 study of Downtown Grand Forks historical resources.

References

Commercial buildings on the National Register of Historic Places in North Dakota
Commercial buildings completed in 1881
National Register of Historic Places in Grand Forks, North Dakota
1881 establishments in Dakota Territory